Local elections were held in  Santa Rosa City on May 9, 2016 within the Philippine general election. The voters elected for the elective local posts in the city: the mayor, vice mayor, and ten councilors.

Overview
Incumbent Mayor Arlene B. Arcillas is term-limited; she will run for representative of the 1st District of Laguna instead. Incumbent Congressman Dan Fernandez is running for Mayor under Liberal Party. His opponents are incumbent Vice Mayor Arnel Gomez, a nominee under Nationalist People's Coalition, and Alicia Lazaga under Partido Demokratiko Pilipino-Lakas ng Bayan. Gomez is Mayor Arcillas's running mate in 2010 and 2013 who decided to run for Mayor despite being eligible to run for a third consecutive term.

Mayor Arcillas's brother, Arnold, is running for Vice Mayor under Liberal Party. His opponents are incumbent councilors Ma. Theresa "Tess" Aala under Nationalist People's Coalition and Sonia Laserna under Aksyon Demokratiko.

Candidates

Administration's Ticket

Opposition's Ticket

Results

Mayor

Vice Mayor

Councilors

|-bgcolor=black
|colspan=8|

References

2016 Philippine local elections
Elections in Santa Rosa, Laguna
2016 elections in Calabarzon